Poreč is a town and municipality in Croatia.

Poreč may also refer to:
 , a village in the municipality of Kutjevo, Croatia
 Poreč, the old name for Donji Milanovac, a town in Serbia
 , a region in Serbia

or:
 Poreče, a region in North Macedonia
 Porečka River, a river in Serbia

See also 
 Miholjački Poreč, a village in the municipality of Donji Miholjac, Croatia